Maps in a Mirror (1990) is a collection of short stories by American writer  Orson Scott Card.  Like Card's novels, most of the stories have a science fiction or fantasy theme.  Some of the stories, such as "Ender's Game", "Lost Boys", and "Mikal's Songbird" were later expanded into novels. Each of the smaller volumes that make up the larger collection as a whole are centered on a theme or genre. For instance, Volume 1, The Changed Man, reprints several of Card's horror stories. The collection won the Locus Award in 1991.

Publication history 
Most of the stories appearing in the book are reprints of stories which were first published in science fiction and fantasy periodicals.

The book has been published as a single large volume, as a two volume set and as a four volume set.  However, only the single volume editions contain: “Book 5: Lost Songs, The Hidden Stories”.

Single volume 
 Maps in a Mirror (1990) Tor Books 
 Maps in a Mirror (1991) Legend Books

Two volume set 
 Maps in a Mirror Volume 1 (1992) Legend Books 
 Maps in a Mirror Volume 2 (1992) Legend Books

Four volume set 
 The Changed Man (1992) Tor Books 
 Flux (1992) Tor Books 
 Monkey Sonatas (1993) Tor Books 
 Cruel Miracles (1992) Tor Books

Story list 

The short stories in this book are:

Book 1 - The Changed Man: Tales of Dread
In the one-volume editions, this section is titled "The Hanged Man: Tales of Dread".
 "Eumenides in the Fourth Floor Lavatory"
 "Quietus"
 "Deep Breathing Exercises"
 "Fat Farm"
 "Closing the Timelid"
 "Freeway Games"
 "A Sepulchre of Songs"
 "Prior Restraint"
 "The Changed Man and the King of Words"
 "Memories of My Head"
 "Lost Boys"

Book 2 - Flux: Tales of Human Futures
 "A Thousand Deaths"
 "Clap Hands and Sing"
 "Dogwalker"
 "But We Try Not to Act Like It"
 "I Put My Blue Genes On"
 "In the Doghouse"
 "The Originist"

Book 3 - Monkey Sonatas: Fables and Fantasies
In the one-volume editions, this section is titled "Maps in a Mirror: Fables and Fantasies".
 "Unaccompanied Sonata"
 "A Cross-Country Trip to Kill Richard Nixon"
 "The Porcelain Salamander"
 "Middle Woman"
 "The Bully and the Beast"
 "The Princess and the Bear"
 "Sandmagic"
 "The Best Day"
 "A Plague of Butterflies"
 "The Monkeys Thought 'Twas All in Fun"

Book 4 - Cruel Miracles: Tales of Death, Hope, and Holiness
 "Mortal Gods"
 "Saving Grace"
 "Eye for Eye"
 "St. Amy's Tale"
 "Kingsmeat"
 "Holy"

Book 5 - Lost Songs: The Hidden Stories
 "Ender's Game"
 "Mikal's Songbird"
 "Prentice Alvin and the No-Good Plow"
 "Malpractice"
 "Follower"
 "Hitching"
 "Damn Fine Novel"
 "Billy's Box"
 "The Best Family Home Evening Ever"
 "Bicicleta"
 "I Think Mom and Dad Are Going Crazy, Jerry"
 "Gert Fram"

See also

 List of works by Orson Scott Card
 Orson Scott Card

References

External links
 About the book Maps in a Mirror from Card's website

1990 short story collections
Short story collections by Orson Scott Card
Science fiction short story collections
Fantasy short story collections
Tor Books books